Isobel Goodwin (born 21 December 2002) is an English footballer, who plays as a forward for Women's Championship club Coventry United.

Career

Aston Villa 
Goodwin joined the Aston Villa Women's academy, working through the age groups. She made her first team debut on 17 November 2021, in a 2–1 home defeat to Sheffield United in the FA Women's League Cup.

Goodwin made her Women's Super League debut on 22 October 2022, as a late substitute in a 1–0 home defeat to Everton.

Coventry United 
On 20 January 2023, Goodwin joined Women's Championship club Coventry United on a free transfer after coming to a mutual agreement to terminate her Aston Villa contract.

International career 
Goodwin played 10 games for the England U17s - scoring her first and second competitive goals for them on 22 September 2018, in a 7–0 victory over Azerbaijan.

Career statistics 
.

References

External links 

 

2002 births
Living people
English women's footballers
Women's Super League players
Aston Villa W.F.C. players
England women's youth international footballers
Women's association footballers not categorized by position
Coventry United W.F.C. players